Fly with the Wind is a 1976 album by jazz pianist McCoy Tyner, his ninth to be released on the Milestone label. It was recorded in January 1976 and features performances by Tyner with a trio, woodwinds and a full string section.

Reception
The Allmusic review by Scott Yanow states the album "...has plenty of memorable moments and is a surprising but logical success; Tyner's orchestral piano blended with the strings very well.". The 2008 CD reissue added two alternate takes as bonus tracks.

Track listing
 "Fly with the Wind" - 8:30
 "Salvadore de Samba" - 12:13
 "Beyond the Sun" - 5:33
 "You Stepped out of a Dream" (Brown, Kahn) - 6:55
 "Rolem" - 5:43
 "Beyond the Sun" [alternate take] - 5:08 Bonus track on 2008 reissue
 "Rolem" [alternate take] - 5:15 Bonus track on 2008 reissue
All compositions by McCoy Tyner except as indicated
Recorded at Fantasy Studios, Berkeley, CA, January 19, 20 & 21, 1976

Personnel 
 McCoy Tyner – piano
 Ron Carter – bass
 Billy Cobham – drums
 Hubert Laws – flute, alto flute
 Paul Renzi – piccolo, flute
 Raymond Duste – oboe
 Stuart Canin – violin
 Franklin Foster – violin
 Daniel Kobialka – violin
 Peter Schaffer – violin
 Edmund Weingart – violin
 Myra Bucky – violin  (tracks 1 & 3)
 Mark Volkert – violin (tracks 4 & 5)
 Selwart Clarke – viola
 Daniel Yale – viola
 Sally Kell – cello
 Kermit Moore – cello
 Linda Wood – harp
 Guilherme Franco – tambourine

References

McCoy Tyner albums
1976 albums
Milestone Records albums
Albums produced by Orrin Keepnews